Australaugeneria rutilans is a scale worm known from northern Australia, south-east Asia and the Persian Gulf, from depths of 28m or less.

Description
Number of segments 40; elytra 15 pairs. Clear, white no pigments other than black eyes. Lateral antennae inserted ventrally (beneath prostomium and median antenna). Notochaetae about as thick as neurochaetae. Bidentate neurochaetae absent.

Commensalism
Australaugeneria rutilans is commensal. Its host taxa are alcyonacean corals.

References

Phyllodocida